Hikmet is a given name. Notable people with the name include:

Given name
 Hikmet Avedis aka Howard Avedis, (1927–2017), film producer and director
 Hikmet Çetin (born 1937), Turkish politician
 Hikmet Fidan (1955–2005), Kurdish-born Turkish politician
 Hikmet Karaman (born 1960), Turkish football coach
 Hikmet Tanyu (1918–1992), Turkish scientist and academic
 Hikmet Temel Akarsu, Turkish novelist
 Hikmet Topuzer, Turkish football player
 Hikmet Vurgun, Turkish handball coach and academic
 Hikmet Uluğbay (born 1939), Turkish politician

Middle name
 Arif Hikmet Koyunoğlu (1888–1982), Turkish architect
 Fatma Hikmet İşmen (1918–2006), Turkish engineer and politician

Surname
 Ahmed Hikmet (born 1984), Bulgarian footballer of Turkish descent
 Ayhan Hikmet (1929–1962), Turkish Cypriot barrister assassinated by the TMT paramilitary group
 Birol Hikmet (born 1982), Turkish football player
 Nâzım Hikmet (1902–1963), Turkish poet, playwright, novelist and memoirist

See also
 Hikmat (disambiguation)
 Hikmet, Ottoman-Turkish magazine

Bosniak masculine given names
Turkish-language surnames
Turkish masculine given names
Turkish feminine given names